The 1966 California lieutenant gubernatorial election was held on November 8, 1966. Republican nominee Robert Finch defeated Democratic incumbent Glenn M. Anderson with 59.79% of the vote.

General election

Candidates
Robert Finch, Republican
Glenn M. Anderson, Democratic

Results

References

California
1966
Lieutenant